William Henry Harrison Beadle is a bronze sculpture depicting the American soldier, lawyer, educator and administrator of the same name by H. Daniel Webster, installed in the United States Capitol as part of the National Statuary Hall Collection. The statue was gifted by the U.S. state of South Dakota in 1938.

A copy of the statue is installed at the South Dakota State Capitol.

See also
 1938 in art

References

External links

 

1938 establishments in Washington, D.C.
1938 sculptures
Bronze sculptures in Washington, D.C.
Monuments and memorials in Washington, D.C.
Beadle
Sculptures of men in South Dakota
Sculptures of men in Washington, D.C.
Statues in South Dakota